Renee Props (born February 15, 1962) in Cordell, Oklahoma is an American actress. She is best known for the role of Ellie Snyder on the CBS daytime soap opera As the World Turns which she played for four years. She is also known to Seinfeld fans as Lois in the episode "The Race" from the 6th season, and for the role of "Nicki" in the film Get Shorty with Danny DeVito and John Travolta.

Her early break came with a starring role in the "Maigret en Arizona" episode of the French television series Les Enquêtes du Commissaire Maigret, and a couple of years later with John Hughes placing her in his 1985 film Weird Science.

Props has guest-starred on the TV shows Law & Order, Silver Spoons, Knight Rider, Hill Street Blues, Facts of Life and others. She was a regular on one of the first series Showtime created, Hard Knocks, which also starred Bill Maher.

References

External links

Living people
1962 births
American film actresses
American television actresses
21st-century American women